Tom Darcey (1 May 1906 – 10 September 1960) was an Australian rower. He competed in the men's coxed four event at the 1948 Summer Olympics.

References

External links
 

1906 births
1960 deaths
Australian male rowers
Olympic rowers of Australia
Rowers at the 1948 Summer Olympics
Sportspeople from Launceston, Tasmania
20th-century Australian people